HJIM van Gasteren is the pseudonym of Henriëtte Johanna Ignatia Maria van Gasteren (Sevenum, 9 September 1964),  a Dutch multimedia artist, known for her, sometimes controversial, self-portraits. She was formerly known as Lilith Love but she changed her artist name in 2020. Recurring themes in her work are: identity, femininity, female archetypes, gender bending, freedom and equality.

Early life
Henriëtte is the youngest in a family of four. Her father was a clog maker and mailman. Since her childhood she has been writing, drawing and cooking. She attended the Schoevers Academy in Nijmegen and worked as an executive secretary from 1983 till 2000.

Writer to photographer
In 2005 Henriëtte resumed writing. Her culinary erotic story Kalfsbraadstuk op tagliatelle met een zachte saus van witte port en kaas (Veal roast on tagliatelle with a smooth sauce of white port and cheese) was published in: Raadselige Roos 2005, a collection of stories that had entered the competition for prose and poetry of the Literary Cafe for the Venray-region.
To illustrate the blogs that she posted online, she started to make self-portraits to go with the stories. At first she used a webcam, then she switched to a simple compact camera. In 2006 the self-portraits almost completely replaced the stories and from that moment on she tells her life story with photos, using a single-lens reflex camera, tripod and remote control.

Controversy
Henriëtte's work has caused controversy on several occasions. She has also been censored during an exhibition in the Euregio-Haus in Mönchengladbach, Germany and during an exhibition in the convention center (and former seminary) Rolduc in Kerkrade, The Netherlands. Her self-portrait Forgive me, Father, for... from the religious series I could’ve had religion made the front page of the Dutch newspaper Sp!ts because of it.

In 2012 she was one of the ten leading artists from Limburg who were exhibited at the Pulchri Studio in The Hague, together with Ted Noten, Charles Eyck and Lei Molin. In the same year her work was also shown in the USA for the first time. During Photoville in Brooklyn Bridge Park, New York City her work could be seen at two exhibitions: The Wonder of Woman and FotoFestival Naarden.

Photo documentary
In 2012 she started her project A house is not a home, in which the houses of complete strangers are the setting for her self-portraits. That same year she also started the photo documentary Risja, a story by Lilith - This is bugging me, about Risja Steeghs a girl who lives in her village and who suffers from a severe form of Lyme disease. The 'Huis voor de Kunsten Limburg' in Roermond, The Netherlands, financially supported the travelling exhibition and the publication of a photo book with the same name. The proceeds from the book sales go to TeekOnMe, a foundation that supports the research of Lyme disease.

Private
Partner Henk Temming.

Books
 2012: Risja, a story by Lilith - This is bugging me 
 2013: A house is not a home 
 2015: Over hoeren & madonna’s (met sonnetten van Paul Sterk) 
 2016: Skinny dipping 
 2020: HJIM, Greatest hits

Museums
 Museum van Bommel van Dam (dutch), Venlo NL
 Museum for modern art IKOB (dutch), Eupen B
 Limburgs Museum (dutch), Venlo NL
 Gemeentemuseum W: (dutch), Weert NL
 CODA museum (dutch), Apeldoorn NL
 Joods Cultureel Kwartier (dutch), Amsterdam NL
 w:nl:Fotomuseum aan het Vrijthof, Maastricht NL
 Museum Aktfotoart Dresden (german), Dresden DE

References

External links

Official website
Interview with GrungeCake Magazine 
Article in Aorta Mag
Interview with Kaltblut

1964 births
Living people
21st-century Dutch artists
Dutch women photographers
People from Horst aan de Maas
21st-century Dutch photographers
21st-century women photographers